West Taphouse is a hamlet in Cornwall, England. It is on the A390 road west of Middle Taphouse and East Taphouse.

References

Hamlets in Cornwall